The 1981 Tangerine Bowl was an American college football bowl game played on December 19, 1981, at Orlando Stadium in Orlando, Florida. The game featured the Southern Miss Golden Eagles and the Missouri Tigers.

Background
Southern Miss had finished with 9 wins in the regular season, their most since 1962 in their second straight bowl appearance, their first consecutive bowl seasons since 1957-58. Missouri had finished 5th in the Big Eight Conference, qualifying for their 4th straight bowl appearance. This was the first Tangerine Bowl for Southern Miss since 1958. This was Missouri's first ever Tangerine Bowl.

Game summary
Bobby Meyer gave the Tigers a 7-0 lead on his three yard touchdown run in the first quarter. The Golden Eagles narrowed the lead to 7-3 on a Steve Clark field goal. Missouri increased their lead with two Bob Lucchesi field goals in the span of 5 minutes to make it 13-3 at halftime. Sammy Winder made it 13-10 on his 4 yard touchdown run in the middle of the third quarter. Lucchesi made it 16-10 on his 30 yard field goal in the third quarter. He added another one from 28 yards out to make it 19-10. Southern Miss narrowed it to 19-17 with 1:03 remaining on a David Sellers touchdown pass to Louis Lipps.

Aftermath
Head Coach Bobby Collins left for SMU after the game, and the Eagles did not return to a bowl game until 1988. Southern Miss has not played in the Tangerine (now Citrus) bowl since. Missouri did not return until 2015.

Statistics

References

Tangerine Bowl
Citrus Bowl (game)
Missouri Tigers football bowl games
Southern Miss Golden Eagles football bowl games
Tangerine Bowl
Tangerine Bowl